The 2015 Galway Senior Football Championship is the 120th edition of the Galway GAA's premier club Gaelic football tournament for senior graded teams in County Galway, Ireland. The tournament consists of 21 teams (N.U.I.G. only enter at the Preliminary Quarter-Final Stage), with the winner going on to represent Galway in the Connacht Senior Club Football Championship. The championship has a back-door format for the first two rounds before proceeding to a knock-out format. Generally, any team to lose two matches will be knocked out of the championship.

All-Ireland champions Corofin were the defending champions after they defeated St Michael's in the previous years final, and they successfully defended their title and also claimed a three-in-a-row of titles when beating Mountbellew-Moylough in the final at Tuam Stadium on 11 October 2015 by 3-13 to 0-12.

This was Killanin's first year back in the senior grade and they made it all the way to a Quarter-Final, losing narrowly to Salthill-Knocknacarra.

Kilkerrin-Clonberne were relegated to the Intermediate grade after 18 years in the top flight.

Team changes 

The following teams have changed division since the 2014 championship season.

To S.F.C. 
Promoted from I.F.C.
 Killanin – (Intermediate Champions)

From S.F.C. 
Relegated to I.F.C.
 Menlough

Round 1 
All 20 teams enter the competition in this round. The 10 winners progress to Round 2A while the 10 losers progress to Round 2B.

Round 2

Round 2A 
The 10 winners from Round 1 enter this round. The 5 winners will enter the draw for the Preliminary Quarter Finals while the 5 losers will play in Round 3.

Round 2B 
The 10 losers from Round 1 enter this round. The 5 winners will go into the Round 3 while the 5 losers will enter the Relegation Playoffs.

Round 3 
The 5 losers from Round 2A enter this round and they play the 5 winners from Round 2B. The 5 winners will go into the draw for the Preliminary Quarter-Finals while the 5 losers will enter the Relegation Playoffs.

Preliminary Quarter-Finals 
The 5 Round 2A winners, the 5 Round 3 winners and N.U.I.G. enter the competition at this stage. A draw was conducted to choose 6 of these teams to play in this round. The 3 winners (along with the 5 teams who receive byes) will proceed to the quarter-finals.

Quarter-finals 
The 3 winners from the Preliminary Quarter-Finals (along with the 5 teams who received byes) enter the quarter-finals.

Semi-finals

Final

Relegation Playoff 
The 5 Round 2B losers and 5 Round 3 losers enter the Relegation Playoff.

Relegation preliminary round 
A draw was conducted and 4 teams were chosen to play in the Relegation Preliminary Round. The 2 winners earn their place in the S.F.C. for 2016 while the losers enter the Relegation Quarter-Final along with the 6 clubs who received byes.

Relegation Quarter-Final 
The 2 Relegation Preliminary Round losers enter the Relegation Quarter-Final along with the 6 clubs who received byes. The 4 winners will earn their place in the 2016 S.F.C. while the 2 losers will enter the Relegation Semi-Finals.

Relegation Semi-Final 
The 4 Relegation Quarter-Final losers play against each other in this round. The 2 winners will earn their place in the 2016 S.F.C. while the 2 losers will enter the Relegation Final.

Relegation Final 
The winner will earn their place in the 2016 S.F.C. while the  loser will be relegated to the Intermediate grade.

References 

Galway Senior Football Championship
Galway Senior Football Championship